María del Carmen Merino was a Spanish film actress. Carmen Merino, the daughter of a Madrid taxi driver briefly became a star after securing a contract with the leading Spanish studio Cifesa. She appeared in the 1935 musical comedy Bound for Cairo.

Selected filmography
 Bound for Cairo (1935)

References

Bibliography 
 Bentley, Bernard. A Companion to Spanish Cinema. Boydell & Brewer 2008.

External links 
 

Year of birth unknown
Year of death unknown
Spanish film actresses
People from Madrid